The 2003 Open Championship was a men's major golf championship and the 132nd Open Championship, held from 17 to 20 July at Royal St George's Golf Club in Sandwich, England. Ben Curtis won his only major title, one stroke ahead of runners-up Thomas Bjørn and Vijay Singh. Bjørn had led in the final round by two shots with three holes to play, but needed three attempts to play out of a greenside bunker on the 16th hole. Playing in his first major championship and number 396 in the world rankings, Curtis became the first debut winner at The Open since Tom Watson in 1975.

Course layout

Source:
The 4th hole was a par 4 in previous Opens

Lengths of the course for previous Opens (since 1950):
 1993: , par 70
 1985: , par 70
 1981: , par 70

Field
1. Top 15 and ties from the 2002 Open Championship
Stuart Appleby (4), Thomas Bjørn (4,5,18), Steve Elkington, Ernie Els (2,3,4,5,10,14), Gary Evans, Sergio García (4,5,18,14), Retief Goosen (4,5,10,14), Søren Hansen (5), Pádraig Harrington (4,5,18), Justin Leonard (2,3,4,14), Thomas Levet, Peter Lonard (4,22), Davis Love III (4,13,18), Shigeki Maruyama (4,14), Peter O'Malley (22), Nick Price (2,3,4,14)
Scott Hoch (4,18) did not play.

2. Open Champions, 1993–2002
John Daly (3), David Duval (3,18), Paul Lawrie (3,4,5), Tom Lehman (3), Greg Norman (3), Mark O'Meara (3), Tiger Woods (3,4,10,11,12,13,14,18)

3. Past Open Champions aged 65 or under on 20 July 2003
Mark Calcavecchia (18), Nick Faldo, Sandy Lyle, Tom Watson
Seve Ballesteros withdrew.
Ian Baker-Finch, Tony Jacklin, Johnny Miller, Jack Nicklaus, Bill Rogers, Lee Trevino, and Tom Weiskopf did not enter.

4. The first 50 players on the OWGR on 29 May 2003
Robert Allenby (14), Rich Beem (12,14), Ángel Cabrera (5), Michael Campbell (5), Paul Casey, K. J. Choi (14), Darren Clarke (18), Fred Couples, Chris DiMarco (14), Bob Estes, Niclas Fasth (5,18), Brad Faxon, Steve Flesch, Fred Funk (14), Jim Furyk (10,14,18), Jay Haas, Charles Howell III (14), Trevor Immelman (5,24), Jerry Kelly (14), Bernhard Langer (5,18), Len Mattiace (14), Phil Mickelson (14,18), Colin Montgomerie (5,6,18), Craig Parry (22), Kenny Perry, Chris Riley, Eduardo Romero (5), Justin Rose (5), Adam Scott (5), Vijay Singh (11,12,14), Jeff Sluman (14), David Toms (12,14,18), Scott Verplank (18), Mike Weir (11)
Rocco Mediate and Kirk Triplett did not play.

5. Top 20 in the final 2002 European Tour Order of Merit
Bradley Dredge, Anders Hansen (6), Stephen Leaney, José María Olazábal (11)

6. The Volvo PGA Championship winners for 2000–03
Ignacio Garrido, Andrew Oldcorn

7. First 5 players, not exempt, in the top 20 of the 2003 European Tour Order of Merit as of 29 May
Brian Davis, Robert-Jan Derksen, Kenneth Ferrie, Mathias Grönberg, Freddie Jacobson

8. First 7 European Tour members, not exempt, in the top 25 of a cumulative money list taken from all official European Tour events from the 2003 Volvo PGA Championship up to and including the 2003 Scottish Open
Alastair Forsyth, Philip Golding, David Howell, Søren Kjeldsen, Mark McNulty, Greg Owen, Ian Poulter

9. The leading 8 players, not exempt having applied (8) above, in the 2003 Scottish Open
Raphaël Jacquelin, David Lynn, Rolf Muntz, Gary Murphy, Nick O'Hern, Iain Pyman, Mark Roe, Charl Schwartzel

10. The U.S. Open Champions for 1994–2003
Lee Janzen, Corey Pavin
Steve Jones did not play.

11. The Masters Champions for 1999–2003

12. The PGA Champions for 1998–2002

13. The Players Champions for 2000–03
Craig Perks, Hal Sutton (18)

14. Top 20 in the final 2002 PGA Tour Official Money List

15. First 5 players, not exempt, in the top 20 of the 2003 PGA Tour Official Money List as of 29 May
Chad Campbell

16. First 7 PGA Tour members, not exempt, in the top 25 of a cumulative money list taken from the 2003 Players Championship and the five PGA Tour events leading up to and including the 2003 Western Open
Joe Durant, Jonathan Kaye, Cliff Kresge, J. L. Lewis, Rory Sabbatini, Duffy Waldorf
Joey Sindelar did not play.
 
17. The leading 8 players, not exempt having applied (16) above, in the 2003 Western Open
Tom Byrum, José Cóceres, Ben Curtis, Luke Donald, Dudley Hart, Skip Kendall, Scott McCarron, Chris Smith

18. Playing members of the 2002 Ryder Cup teams
Paul Azinger, Stewart Cink, Pierre Fulke, Paul McGinley, Jesper Parnevik, Phillip Price, Lee Westwood

19. The 2002 Canadian Open Champion
John Rollins

20. The 2002 Japan Open Champion
David Smail

21. Winner of the 2002 Asian PGA Tour Order of Merit
Jyoti Randhawa

22. Top 3 from the 2002–03 PGA Tour of Australasia Order of Merit

23. Top 3 from the 2002 Japan Golf Tour Order of Merit
Shingo Katayama, Nobuhito Sato, Toru Taniguchi

24. Top 2 from the 2002–03 Sunshine Tour Order of Merit
Mark Foster

25. The leading player, not exempt, in the 2003 Mizuno Open
Todd Hamilton

26. First 4, not exempt having applied (25) above, in the top 20 of a cumulative money list taken from all official Japan Golf Tour events from the 2003 Japan PGA Championship up to and including the 2003 Mizuno Open
Hur Suk-ho, Hirofumi Miyase, Hideto Tanihara, Katsuyoshi Tomori

27. The 2002 Senior British Open Champion
Noboru Sugai

28. The 2003 Amateur Champion
Gary Wolstenholme (a)

29. The 2002 U.S. Amateur Champion
Ricky Barnes (a)

30. The 2002 European Amateur Champion
Raphaël Pellicioli forfeited his exemption by turning pro.

Final Qualifying (Sunday 13 July and Monday 14 July)
Littlestone – Steven Bowditch, Robert Coles, Scott Godfrey (a), Adam Le Vesconte, Christopher Smith, Anthony Wall, Paul Wesselingh
North Foreland – Gary Emerson, Andrew George, Adam Mednick, Mårten Olander, Hennie Otto, Anthony Sproston, Simon Wakefield
Prince's – Mathew Goggin, Jarrod Moseley, Cameron Percy, Andrew Raitt, Marco Ruiz, Steen Tinning, Ian Woosnam
Royal Cinque Ports – Markus Brier, Charles Challen, Ben Crane, Peter Fowler, Euan Little, Malcolm MacKenzie, Mark Smith

Round summaries

First round
Thursday, 17 July 2003

Second round
Friday, 18 July 2003

Amateurs: Barnes (+11), Wolstenholme (+14), Godfrey (+18).

Third round
Saturday, 19 July 2003

Mark Roe shot a 67 to finish at one over par, but he and playing partner Jesper Parnevik were disqualified, having failed to exchange scorecards and therefore having signed incorrect scorecards. The rule that resulted in the disqualifications was changed two years later; Roe never played in another major.

Final round
Sunday, 20 July 2003

Ben Curtis shot six-under in the first 11 holes to grab a 2 stroke lead, but dropped four strokes in the next six holes to fall behind, and sank a  par putt on the final hole to post the clubhouse lead. Vijay Singh and Tiger Woods also moved into early contention, but fell behind Curtis with late bogeys, leaving Thomas Bjørn with a three stroke lead with four holes to play.  He finished bogey-double bogey-bogey-par and tied for second, one stroke back.

It was not only Curtis' first win, but his first top-10 finish in a PGA Tour event.

Source:

Scorecard
Final round

Cumulative tournament scores, relative to par
Source:

References

External links
Royal St George's 2003 (Official site)
132nd Open Championship - Royal St George's (European Tour)

The Open Championship
Golf tournaments in England
Open Championship
Open Championship
Open Championship